The UNIS-UN Conference is organized and run by high school students from the United Nations International School (UNIS). It aims to foster an environment in which young adults can grow their worldview and expand their horizons, whilst learning about and discussing important, influential issues in our world today. By inviting a variety of different schools from around the world, with different outlooks and cultures, it creates an atmosphere in which students can learn and form opinions in a globalized setting and ultimately become better, well-rounded world citizens. The conference is held annually in the General Assembly Hall of the United Nations Headquarters. The use of the General Assembly Hall by the UNIS-UN Conference is a strong representation of the tie between the United Nations International School and the United Nations. The conference is targeted towards the international high-school students that make up the majority of its audience. The conference is run with an invitation-only policy.

Each year, a new topic of interest and importance is chosen for the conference. The UNIS-UN Conference is designed to provide students with expert knowledge imparted by provocative guest speakers. The conference also endeavors to give students a platform to express and debate their own opinions and views. The conference has gained much fame over the years, and is commonly the first thing associated with the United Nations International School. More than seven hundred students hailing from six continents attend the conference. Approximately 400 of the attending students are enrolled at UNIS. An additional 300 - 400 more students are invited from international schools around the world.

History 
UNIS-UN was founded in 1976 by several UNIS students in collaboration with a tutorial house (UNIS equivalent of high school) teacher. The conference was first held on March 3 and 4, 1977, in the General Assembly Hall of the United Nations Headquarters, and became a tradition every year since then. The 2020 conference was cancelled due to the COVID-19 pandemic. The organizing committee has grown over the years (to its current number of approximately seventy).

Organization 

The UNIS-UN Organizing Committee is split up into several committees (Visiting Schools, Finance and Resource, Tech, Public Information & Communications, Debate, Editing, and Speakers) to ease the organization process. Visiting Schools is in charge of organizing the students visiting from abroad. Finance and Resources buys merchandise for the attendees to purchase. Technology organizes any technological feats, like presentations for the speakers. PIC/PR & Communications deals with advertising the conference throughout UNIS, and Debate sorts out the student and speaker debates. Editing edits the articles for the Working Paper, and Speakers finds people to speak at the conference. Each committee is headed by one or two students (usually juniors and seniors). These committee heads make up the UNIS-UN Executive Committee; however, there are a select few students who are not the heads of the commissions but are prominent members of the commissions.

Preparations for the conference are begun nearly a year in advance and include finding and researching a topic of global relevance, drawing up a list of speakers, inviting several hundred students from schools all over the world, and compiling a Working Paper of articles pertaining to the topic written and edited by members of the UNIS-UN Committee. The conference is broadcast live on the Internet, via a web stream on the UNIS-UN website.

Past conferences 
Previous UNIS-UN speakers include
 Dr. Sanjay Gupta
 Dr. Anthony Fauci
 Christiane Amanpour 
 Ban Ki-Moon (Secretary-General of the UN)
 Kofi Annan (Former Secretary-General of the UN)
 Jan Eliasson (President of the General Assembly of the UN)
 Danny Glover
 Harry Belafonte
 Vanessa Redgrave
 Morgan Spurlock
 Hillary Clinton
 Clay Shirky
 Nicholas Negroponte
 Maria Luiza Ribeiro Viotti (Permanent Representative of Brazil to the United Nations)
 Marc Rotenberg
 Judith Donath
 Brandon Stanton (HONY, guest speaker of the 2013 conference)
 Paloma Escudero (Director of Communications at Unicef)
 Casey Neistat
 Susan Chira (Assistant Managing Editor at New York Times)
 Buzz Bissinger
 Trevor Johnson (Director of Global Agency Development at Facebook)
 Suroosh Alvi

Previous topics include Youth at Risk: The Future in Our Hands, Modern Mass Media: The Influence of Information, Global Health: Rights and Responsibilities in the 21st Century, The Role of the Corporation in Today's World, "Global Warming: Confronting the Crisis"; in 2008, "The Pursuit of Energy: A Catalyst for Conflict"; in 2009, "The Food Crisis: A Global Challenge"; in 2010, "Bioethics: Striking a Balance"; in 2011, "The Web: Wiring our World"; in 2012, "Human Exploitation: Exposing the Unseen"; in 2013, "Modern Youthquake: A Generation's Impact"; in 2016, Media's Influence: Opinions, Activism, & Outcomes; in 2017, Migration: Crossing the Line; in 2018, Under CTRL: Technology, Innovation and the Future of Work; and in 2019, 2019 Ripple Effect: The Water Crisis.

References

External links
 UNIS-UN
 United Nations International School
 The United Nations
 2014 Conference Live Stream

International conferences in the United States